The Gran Premio Sportivi di Poggiana is a professional one day cycling race held annually in Poggiana, Italy. It has been part of the UCI Europe Tour since 2011 in category 1.2U.

Winners

References

Cycle races in Italy
UCI Europe Tour races
Recurring sporting events established in 1975
1975 establishments in Italy